Eraniel Railway station (Station code: ERL) in Eraniel is the most important railway station of Kallkkulam taluk of Kanyakumari district in the Tamil Nadu state of India. The station has two platforms and falls on the Kanyakumari–Thiruvananthapuram line in the Thiruvananthapuram division of the Southern Railway zone. All daily trains passing through the station halts in Eraniel station.
The famous Mandaikadu Bagavathi Amman Temple, Colachel Port, I.R.E Industries in Manavalakurichi and Padmanabhapuram Palace are situated nearby the station. The station also is the nearest railhead for two municipalities – Padmanabapuram, Colachel and for 25 villages.

Revenue

Places of interest 

Mandaikadu Bagavathi Amman Temple
Padmanabhapuram Palace
Thiruvithamcode
Kumaracoil Murugan Temple
Sivalayams
Muttom
 Thiruparrapu Falls
Udayagirib Fort
Colachel

Services

Extension of trains
 Extension of Tiruchi–Tirunelveli Intercity Express 22627/22628 up to Thiruvananthapuram
 Extension of –Mangaluru 16603/16604 Mavali Express up to Kanniyakumari

New train services
 Kaniyakumari to Vasco-Da-Gama (Goa) daily train via  and Ernakulam

Technical details
 Total Thiruvananthapuram–Nagercoil section km = 71.05
 Line capacity of Thiruvananthapuram–Nagercoil section : 114.1%
 Maximum permissible speed of Thiruvananthapuram–Nagercoil section : 80 km/h
 Total stations =13
 Block station =6
 CNC station = 1
 Halt station =6
 Critical block section = Eraniel–Nagercoil
 Station km = 272.62

Transfer Division
The Thiruvananthapuram–Nagercoil–Kanyakumari railway line was opened on 16 April 1979, and was then under Madurai division. Thiruvananthapuram division was formed on second October 1979 carving out certain sections from Madurai division. The metre-gauge sections of Madurai division were retained, while all the newly laid broad-gauge sections of Madurai division were transferred to Thiruvananthapuram division. Thus, the Thiruvananthapuram–Nagercoil–Kanyakumari BG line, and the under-construction Tirunelveli–Nagercoil BG line were transferred to Thiruvananthapuram division.  It was then mentioned that when the Tirunelveli–Madurai line is converted into BG line the sections falling under Kanyakumari district and Tirunelveli district would be transferred back to Madurai division. The Thrunelveli–Madurai line was converted into BG line on 8-4-1981 and ever since people from south Tamil Nadu have been demanding the merger of Kanyakumari BG line with Madurai division.

Ever since its inception, Kanyakumari district has been willfully neglected by Thiruvananthapuram division, be it in providing railway infrastructure, providing the required train services, passenger amenities etc. Kanyakumari terminal station lacks the required railway infrastructures and therefore request for more train services were always turned down by them citing the same handicap as the reason. Kanyakumari district people are demanding transfer Kanyakumari–Nagercoil–Kuzhithurai–Thiruvananthapuram  (except Thiruvananthapuram station) and Nagercoil–Tirunelveli (up to Melappalayam) section to Madurai division, at the earliest. It is also stressed that under any circumstances, the above places should be under the administration of southern railway zone that is with Chennai only. Even in future also this area should not be attached with any other zone including Trivandrum, Kerala.

Suburban stations

Gallery

References

External links

 Satellite Map of Eraniel railway station
 Eraniel railway station details

Railway stations in Kanyakumari district
Thiruvananthapuram railway division
Railway stations opened in 1979